North Awyu is a Papuan language of Papua, Indonesia. Its exact position within the Awyu languages is unclear due to lack of data.

References

Languages of western New Guinea
Awyu–Dumut languages